Poa cuspidata, commonly called early bluegrass, is a species of flowering plant in the grass family (Poaceae). It is native to the eastern United States, where its range extends from Appalachian regions into the Coastal Plain, where it is less common. In the Appalachian mountains, it is a common species found in forest openings.

Poa cuspidata derives its common name from its early flowering period, which begins in March with the very first spring wildflowers. Within its range, other Poa generally bloom later in the spring season.

Description

Poa cuspidata is a rhizomatous perennial. The plant has a loose and nodding panicle, with branches that bear three or four flowered spikelets.

References

cuspidata